The Oxford University Football Association is the governing body of football at the University of Oxford.

References

External links

County football associations
Football in Oxfordshire
Sports organizations established in 1872